Myrkgrav is a Norwegian blackened folk metal band with a single member, Lars Jensen. Jensen founded the band in 2003 and released a demo in 2004 entitled Fra fjellheimen kaller... (English: "From the Mountain Home Calls..."). His first album, Trollskau, skrømt og kølabrenning ("Trollish Woods, Wraiths, and Coalburning"), was released on 27 October 2006. The lyrics are about local history, legends, and folklore from Ringerike, Lommedalen, and Hole, from around the 17th century to the end of the 19th century. The songs are sung in a local Norwegian dialect.

Members
 Lars Jensen – vocals, guitars, bass guitar, keyboards, drums, folk instruments

Session musicians
 Stine Ross Idsø – hardanger fiddle (2008–present)
 Olav Mjelva – hardanger fiddle (2008–present)

Guest musicians
 Aleksandra Rajković – keyboards
 Erlend Antonsen – bass guitar
 Espen Hammer – bass guitarist on Trollskau, skrømt og kølabrenning
 Benita Eriksdatter – vocals on "Gygra og St. Olav"
 Sindre Nedland – clean vocals on Trollskau, skrømt og kølabrenning

Discography

 Fra fjellheimen kaller... (demo) (2004)
 Trollskau, skrømt og kølabrenning (2006)
 Sjuguttmyra / Ferden går videre (split release with Voluspaa) (2011)
 Sjuguttmyra (EP) (2013)
 Takk og farvel; tida er blitt ei annen (2016)

References

External links

 Facebook profile
 Myspace profile

Musical groups established in 2003
2003 establishments in Norway
One-man bands
Norwegian black metal musical groups
Norwegian viking metal musical groups
Norwegian folk metal musical groups
Musical groups from Buskerud